Boustan is a Lebanese-Canadian fast food restaurant chain in Montreal, Quebec. It was established in 1986.

Boustan is the Arabic word for orchard.

History
Imad Smaidi became the full-time owner of the restaurant, after being a silent partner. Smaidi immigrated to Canada from Lebanon in 1972, studied engineering at École Polytechnique de Montréal and worked for Philips before having to quit to run Boustan full-time.

The restaurant moved several times before settling in its current location, 2020A Crescent Street in downtown Montreal.

Boustan has been frequented by, among others, former Prime Minister of Canada Pierre Trudeau and the now current Prime Minister of Canada Justin Trudeau.
and some of the rosters from the Montreal Canadiens and Montreal Alouettes.

Smaidi, due to his popularly, was called "Mr. Boustan" instead of his real name.  Smaidi put the restaurant up for sale in early 2011.  He eventually sold the restaurant to George and Peter Hatzimargaritis and Mario Daigneault on March 25, 2012 for an undisclosed sum.

Boustan chain
In 2014 Boustan opened a second location at 19 Ste Catherine East which serves the same menu as the original location.

In 2015 Boustan opened further locations in Anjou/Rivière-des-Prairies–Pointe-aux-Trembles (RDP) at 8000 Henri-Bourassa East and in Dollard-des-Ormeaux at 3980 boul St Jean which also serves the same menu as the original location.

In 2016 Boustan opened its fifth location in Laval, Quebec at 1601 Daniel Johnson corner St Martin.

In 2017 Boustan opened locations in Verdun, NDG, Rosemont, Côte-des-Neiges, Kirkland, St-Henri, Hochelaga-Maisonneuve, St Leonard and Blainville. In 2019 they opened a location in Vaudreuil-Dorion. It has become a fast growing franchise expecting more new locations.

In 2021, Boustan opened their first location outside the Greater Montreal area in Lévis.

As of March 2022, a location in Ottawa on Rideau street and in Scarborough Ontario would be the first locations opened outside of Quebec bringing the franchises to a total of 41 locations.

See also
 List of Lebanese restaurants

References

External links

BOUSTAN - Lebanese Restaurant

1986 establishments in Quebec
Downtown Montreal
Lebanese-Canadian culture
Lebanese restaurants
Middle Eastern-Canadian culture in Quebec
Restaurants established in 1986
Restaurants in Montreal